Ballyveelick is a townland in the civil parish of Castletownroche, County Cork, Ireland.

Evidence of ancient settlement in the townland include the remains of a number of burnt mounds and ringforts.

See also
 List of townlands of the barony of Fermoy

References 

Townlands of County Cork